Machen is a village in South Wales.

Machen may also refer to:
 Lower Machen, a hamlet near Machen
 Machen RFC, a rugby union club based in Machen
 Machen (surname), various people
 Mynydd Machen, a hill located near Machen

Notes 
 "Machen" is a German verb meaning "to make" or "to do", often found in the names of works (notably musical works) in that language.

See also 
 Bedwas, Trethomas and Machen, a community in the county borough of Caerphilly which includes Machen
 
 Machin (disambiguation)
 Machon (disambiguation)